Sheraton Taitung Hotel is located in Taitung City, Taitung County, Taiwan. Formerly the Queena Plaza Hotel, it was renovated and reopened as a Sheraton in May 2015. The 19-storey,  hotel has 290 rooms and suites and has facilities such as a fitness center, swimming pool, multipurpose entertainment room and sauna. The hotel is the tallest building in Taitung. It is a franchise of Sheraton Hotels and Resorts and is the third Sheraton hotel in Taiwan, after Sheraton Grand Taipei Hotel and Sheraton Hsinchu Hotel.

Restaurants and Bars
AliHi Buffet: A buffet restaurant offering seafood dishes from a variety of cuisines.
HOYEA: A Cantonese restaurant located on the 2nd floor serving traditional dim sum and other Chinese delicacies.
Moon Bar: Bar located on the 8th floor serving whiskey and cocktails.
BAR16 Bakery: A pastry shop on the ground floor offering a variety of breads, cakes, pastries and desserts.

Transportation
The hotel is located around 15 minutes' drive from Taitung railway station and 20 minutes from Taitung Airport.

See also
Sheraton Hotels and Resorts
Sheraton Grand Taipei Hotel
Sheraton Hsinchu Hotel
Sheraton Taoyuan Hotel

References

External links
 Sheraton Taitung Hotel official site

Taitung
Hotel buildings completed in 2014
2015 establishments in Taiwan
Hotels established in 2015
Hotels in Taiwan